Scomber is a genus of fish in the family Scombridae living in the open ocean found in Atlantic, Indian and Pacific Ocean. The genus Scomber and the genus Rastrelliger comprise the tribe Scombrini, known as the "true mackerels". These fishes have an elongated body, highly streamlined, muscular and agile. The eyes are large, the head is elongated, with a big mouth provided with teeth. They have two dorsal triangular fins, with some stabilizing fins along the caudal peduncle. The basic color is blue-green with a silvery white belly and a darker back, usually black mottled.

Species
There are currently 5 recognized species in this genus:
 Scomber australasicus G. Cuvier, 1832 (Blue mackerel)
 Scomber colias J. F. Gmelin, 1789 (Atlantic chub mackerel)
 Scomber indicus E. M. Abdussamad, Sukumaran & Ratheesh, 2016 (Indian chub mackerel) 
 Scomber japonicus Houttuyn, 1782 (Chub mackerel)
 Scomber scombrus Linnaeus, 1758 (Atlantic mackerel)

Fossil record
Fossils of this genus are found from the Oligocene to the Pleistocene (33.9 to 1.806 million years ago). They are known from various localities of Germany, Italy, Romania, Japan and Mexico. Fossil species include:
 S. collettei (Bannikov and Erebakan, 2022) from the lowermost Middle Miocene of the Krasnodar Region.
 S. cubanicus (Danil'chenko 1960) from the Upper Oligocene of Krasnodar Territory.
 S. voitestii (Pauca 1929) from the Middle Oligocene of the Carpathian Menilite slates.
 S. sp. from the Middle-Upper Miocene of the Kurasi Formation on Sakhalin.

References

 
Scombridae
Marine fish genera
Taxa named by Carl Linnaeus